{{DISPLAYTITLE:C14H17NO6}}
The molecular formula C14H17NO6 (molar mass: 295.29 g/mol) may refer to:

 Indican
 Prunasin, a cyanogenic glucoside
 Sambunigrin, a cyanogenic glucoside

Molecular formulas